
The following lists events that happened during 1825 in South Africa.

Events
 The Dutch Reformed Church establish a congregation in Somerset East
 The first steamship arrives in Table Bay
 The depreciated rix dollar is converted into the British sterling
 The Anglican St. Mary's Collegiate Church is started in Port Elizabeth

Births
 17 September - Donald Currie, shipping magnate and donor of the Currie Cups for rugby union and cricket, is born in Greenock, Scotland
 10 October - Stephanus Johannes Paul Kruger is born in Cradock, Cape Colony

Deaths
 31 January - Petrus Johannes Truter (77), explorer and official in the East India Company, dies in Swellendam

References
See Years in South Africa for list of References

 
South Africa
Years in South Africa